Muirghis Cananach Ua Conchobhair, Prince of Connacht, died 1224.

Muirghis was one of the children of the last Gaelic King of Ireland, Ruaidrí Ua Conchobair. He became a monk and was a noted poet and singer.

His death is noted in the Annals of Lough Ce:

'Muirghes Cananach, son of Ruaidhri O'Conchobhair, the most expert man that ever came of the Gaeidhel in reading, and in psalm-singing, and in versemaking, died in this year, and was interred in Cunga-Feichin (Cong), after the triumph of unction and penitence.

External links
 http://www.ucc.ie/celt/published/T100010A/index.html

Medieval Irish poets
Irish male singers
12th-century Irish writers
13th-century Irish writers
People from County Mayo
People from County Galway
13th-century Irish poets
Irish male poets
Irish-language writers